Serhiy Mikhailovich Hryn (born 27 December 1981) is a Ukrainian rower.

References

External links

1981 births
Living people
Ukrainian male rowers
Sportspeople from Kyiv
Olympic rowers of Ukraine
Rowers at the 2004 Summer Olympics
Rowers at the 2008 Summer Olympics
Rowers at the 2012 Summer Olympics
Olympic bronze medalists for Ukraine
Olympic medalists in rowing
Medalists at the 2004 Summer Olympics
World Rowing Championships medalists for Ukraine